Luka Romero (born 18 November 2004) is a professional footballer who plays as an attacking midfielder for  club Lazio. Born in Mexico and raised in Spain, he represents Argentina at youth international level.

Coming through the youth system, Romero made his first-team debut with Mallorca in La Liga aged 15 years and 219 days, becoming the youngest player to play in a top five European league. After alternating in 2020–21 between Mallorca's first team and B team, Romero joined Serie A side Lazio in 2021. His first goal in 2022 made him the first 2004-born player to score in the Italian top flight.

Early life
Born in Durango City, Mexico, to Argentine parents, Romero moved to Villanueva de Córdoba, Andalusia, Spain, at the age of three. He moved to Formentera, Balearic Islands at the age of seven, and started to play at Ibiza-based PE Sant Jordi.

In 2011, Romero had a trial with Barcelona, but could not sign as he was under the age of 10 and did not live in the area. In 2015, at the age of ten, he signed an eight-year youth contract with Mallorca. In his first four years, Romero scored 230 goals in 108 matches.

Club career
Romero was called up to train with the main squad of Mallorca by manager Vicente Moreno on 5 June 2020. Eleven days later, he was included in the list for a La Liga match against Villarreal after being given special authorization at the age of 15 years and 221 days, but remained an unused substitute in the 1–0 away loss. Romero played his first match with Mallorca on 24 June, replacing Iddrisu Baba late into a 0–2 away defeat against Real Madrid. Aged 15 years and 219 days, he broke Sansón's record for the youngest player to ever play a professional match in La Liga. He also broke the age record for the five top European leagues which was held by Kalman Gerencseri since 1960.

Romero started the 2020–21 campaign with the main squad, but also appeared with the reserves in Tercera División in some occasions. He scored his first senior goals on 1 November, netting a brace with the B-side in a 3–0 away win against CD Llosetense. Romero scored his first professional goal on 29 November, netting the fourth in a 4–0 Segunda División home routing of UD Logroñés.

On 19 August 2021, Romero was signed by Serie A club Lazio. On the opening day of the 2021–22 season, he became Lazio's youngest ever player when he made his debut at the age of 16 years, 9 months and 10 days in their 6–1 victory over Spezia. On 17 October, Romero was included in The Guardians 60 best young talents in world football born in 2004. He scored his first goal for Lazio on 10 November, the winner of a 1–0 win against Monza, becoming the first player born in 2004 to score in Serie A.

International career
Born in Mexico to an Argentine family, he moved to Spain at a young age. Romero holds all three passports, and is currently eligible to represent all three senior national teams. He represented Argentina internationally at under-15 level in the 2019 South American U-15 Championship, where they finished runners-up, scoring two goals in six matches. In March 2020, Romero was called up to represent Argentina's under-17s at the Montaigu Tournament, but the competition was cancelled due to the COVID-19 pandemic.

On 6 March 2022, Romero received his first-ever call up to Argentina's senior team by manager Lionel Scaloni. On 26 March 2022, Romero played for the under-20 team in a 2–2 draw against the United States U20s.

Personal life
Romero's father, Diego, was a professional footballer. His twin brother Tobías is also a footballer, and plays as a goalkeeper.

Career statistics

Club

References

External links
 
 
 

2004 births
Living people
People from Durango City
Mexican people of Argentine descent
Sportspeople of Argentine descent
Spanish people of Argentine descent
Citizens of Argentina through descent
Argentine footballers
Mexican footballers
Spanish footballers
Association football midfielders
La Liga players
Segunda División players
Tercera División players
Serie A players
RCD Mallorca players
RCD Mallorca B players
S.S. Lazio players
Argentina youth international footballers
Argentine expatriate footballers
Mexican expatriate footballers
Argentine expatriate sportspeople in Spain
Mexican expatriate sportspeople in Spain
Expatriate footballers in Spain
Expatriate footballers in Italy
Naturalised citizens of Spain